Fort Saint-Jean may refer to:

Fort Saint-Jean (Lyon)
Fort Saint-Jean (Marseille)
Fort Saint-Jean (Quebec)
 Saint-Jean-sur-Richelieu, city developed around the original Fort